John W. Harris may refer to:
 John Woods Harris (1810–1887), Attorney General of Texas
 John Harris (creolist)
 John W. Harris, founder of National Beta Club